Udgir Assembly constituency is one of the six Maharashtra Assembly constituencies in Latur.

Members of Assembly
The very first MLA was madhavrao patil from ghonsi.
1994: Manohar Patwari, Indian National Congress
1999: Govind Kendre, Bharatiya Janata Party
2004: Chandrashekhar Bhosale, Nationalist Congress Party
2009: Sudhakar Bhalerao, Bharatiya Janata Party
2014: Sudhakar Bhalerao, Bharatiya Janata Party
2019: Sanjay Baburao Bansode, Nationalist Congress Party

Election Results

Assembly Elections 2019

Assembly Elections 2014

Assembly Elections 2009

References
 http://electionaffairs.com/results/State_assembly/Maharashtra_2009/maharashtra_assembly_results_2009m.html
 https://eci.gov.in/files/file/11699-maharashtra-legislative-assembly-election-2019/

Assembly constituencies of Latur district
Latur
Assembly constituencies of Maharashtra